Astronomer Royal is a senior post in the Royal Households of the United Kingdom. There are two officers, the senior being the Astronomer Royal dating from 22 June 1675; the junior is the Astronomer Royal for Scotland dating from 1834.

The post was created by King Charles II in 1675, at the same time as he founded the Royal Observatory Greenwich. He appointed John Flamsteed, instructing him "."

The Astronomer Royal was director of the Royal Observatory Greenwich from the establishment of the post in 1675 until 1972. The Astronomer Royal became an honorary title in 1972 without executive responsibilities and a separate post of Director of the Royal Greenwich Observatory was created to manage the institution.

The Astronomer Royal today receives a stipend of 100 GBP per year and is a member of the Royal Household, under the general authority of the Lord Chamberlain. After the separation of the two offices, the position of Astronomer Royal has been largely honorary, although the holder remains available to advise the Sovereign on astronomical and related scientific matters, and the office is of great prestige.

There was formerly a Royal Astronomer of Ireland, a post that seemingly ended with Irish independence.

The Astronomer Royal is mentioned in H.G. Wells' novel The War of the Worlds and in George Orwell's Down and Out in Paris and London. He also makes an appearance in the lyrics of Gilbert and Sullivan'''s The Pirates of Penzance and plays an important role in Fred Hoyle's novel The Black Cloud''.

Astronomers Royal

References

External links
 Official website

Ceremonial officers in the United Kingdom
Lists of British people
Positions within the British Royal Household
Astronomer Royal
Royal Observatory, Greenwich